Laurie J. Heyer is an American mathematician specializing in genomics and bioinformatics. She is Kimbrough Professor of Mathematics at Davidson College, director of Davidson's Jay Hurt Hub for Innovation and Entrepreneurship, and former chair of Davidson's Mathematics and Computer Science Department.

Education
Heyer is a graduate of the University of Texas at Arlington. She completed her Ph.D. in 1998 at the University of Colorado Boulder. Her dissertation, The Probabilistic Behavior of Sequence Analysis Scores with Application to Structural Alignment of RNA, was jointly supervised by John A. Williamson and Gary Stormo.

Textbooks
With Malcolm Campbell, Heyer is the author of the textbook Discovering Genomics, Proteomics, & Bioinformatics (Benjamin Cummings and Cold Spring Harbor Laboratory Press, 2003; 2nd ed., Pearson, 2007). Campbell, Heyer, and Christopher Paradise also wrote the electronic text Integrating Concepts in Biology.

References

Year of birth missing (living people)
Living people
21st-century American mathematicians
American women mathematicians
University of Texas at Arlington alumni
University of Colorado Boulder alumni
Davidson College faculty
21st-century American women